Michael Thomas Kotschenreuther is an American physicist.

Kotschenreuther earned a doctorate at the Princeton University, where he authored the thesis The effect of small-scale fluctuations on several plasma processes. He subsequently joined the Institute for Fusion Studies at the University of Texas at Austin. In 1998, Kotschenreuther was elected a fellow of the American Physical Society "[f]or fundamental contributions to the self-consistent theory of magnetic island formation, for the implementation of the delta f numerical technique, and for developing theoretical techniques that quantitatively describe plasma transport in tokamaks." In 2001, he was promoted to senior research scientist at the Institute for Fusion Studies.

References

Living people
Year of birth missing (living people)
20th-century American physicists
21st-century American physicists
American plasma physicists
Princeton University alumni
University of Texas at Austin faculty